Désiré Charles Emanuel van Monckhoven (1834–1882) was a Belgian chemist, physicist, and photographic researcher.  He was also an inventor and author.

Works 
He wrote several of the earliest books on photography and photographic optics.  His original French works were later translated to English and other languages.

He invented or developed an enlarger (1864), a dry collodion process (1871), improvements of the carbon print process (1875–80), and improved silver-bromide gelatine emulsions.

Selected work
 1857 – Méthodes simplifiées de photographie sur papier (Simplified methods of photography on paper). Paris : Marion. 
 1858 – Procédé nouveau de photographie sur plaques de fer: et notice sur les vernis photographiques et le collodion sec (A new process of photography on ferrous plates).  Paris : A. Gaudin.  OCLC 7011879
 1862 – Traité populaire de photographie sur collodion. Paris: Lieber.  OCLC 17454826
 1863 – A Popular Treatise on Photography: also A description of, and remarks on, The stereoscope and photographic optics (tr. W.H. Thornthwaite) London: Virtue Brothers.  OCLC 17368038  See  excerpt transcription
 1867 –  Photographic Optics; Including the Description of Lenses and Enlarging Apparatus. London: Robert Hardwicke.  OCLC 5332903 – reprinted by Arno Press, New York.   OCLC 4642259

See also
 Diaphragm (optics)
 Ghent University
 History of the camera
 Royal Photographic Society

Notes

References
 Beach, Frederick Converse.  "Modern amateur photography," Harper's Magazine. January 1889. pp. 288–297.
 Day, Lance and Ian McNeil. (1996).  Biographical Dictionary of the History of Technology. London: Taylor & Francis. 
  Hannavy, John. (2008).  Encyclopedia of Nineteenth-century Photography. London: CRC Press. 
 "The Late Dr. Van Monckhoven," Nature. Volume 26, Issue 677, pp. 601– 602 (October 1882).

External links
 Monckhoven biographical note
  Exhibitions of the Royal Photographic Society, 1870–1915:   Exhibitor records, Dr. van Monckhoven, 1877

Optical engineers
Belgian physicists
Belgian chemists
19th-century Belgian inventors
1834 births
1882 deaths
Ghent University alumni